Heliotrygon rosai, the Rosa's round ray, is a species of freshwater fish in the family Potamotrygonidae. It is native to the Amazon basin (Marajó to Peru) in South America. It has not been evaluated by the IUCN red list.

References

Potamotrygonidae
Freshwater fish of Brazil
Freshwater fish of Peru
Fish of the Amazon basin
Fish described in 2011